Pleasantview is an unincorporated community in Oneida County, Idaho, United States.

References

Unincorporated communities in Oneida County, Idaho
Unincorporated communities in Idaho